Waiting for a Train may refer to:
 "Waiting for a Train" (Jimmie Rodgers song) (1929)
 "Waiting for a Train" (Flash and the Pan song) (1983)